Backlash is a fictional character from the Wildstorm universe who first appeared in StormWatch #3 in 1993 and was featured in his own comic book series, which ran from 1994 to 1997. His daughter Jodi also uses the name.

Fictional character biography 

Marc Slayton was born in Atlantis about three thousand years ago, the son of a human mother and Lord S'ylton, an enhanced Kherubim lord of the alien colony Atlantis. When his father sacrifices his life to imprison one-time allies the D'rahn, a race of hostile aliens whose attack leads to the sinking of Atlantis, young Marc is spirited away by Ferrian, his father's former advisor. Ferrian raises the child to adulthood, tutoring him in fighting skills for his protection. Once Marc is old enough to look after himself, Ferrian drops out of sight and leaves him to fend for himself.

Marc spends the next three thousand years travelling around the world, living a life of adventure. He has only fragmented memories of his long life. At one point he is a ninja, at another he is a medieval knight. In World War II, he is recruited for a mission as an intelligence specialist for Team Zero. No rank is seen until the 1960s when he is an Air Force Colonel, working as part of the extraterrestrial threats squad Team One. Later he joins Team 7, a special ops unit which is deliberately exposed to a mutagenic chemical called the Gen-Factor. All of the members develop superhuman powers—in Marc's case some of these are the result of his alien heritage being fully activated. Team 7 finish their final mission and then go AWOL, but Marc makes a deal with their boss, brokering his services (and those of John Lynch and Michael Cray) in return for the rest of the squad and their families being left alone.

Stormwatch

Backlash is then assigned to join and spy on StormWatch, the U.N.'s crisis-intervention superteam. He works as the group's field leader and instructor until he loses several members of the first team (later dubbed Stormwatch Prime) during a mission in Kuwait. After this tragedy he switches to being the full-time instructor. When a Daemonite called S'ryn puts Marc's girlfriend Major Diane LaSalle into a coma, he deserts StormWatch to track her down, breaking  Cabal agent Taboo out of prison to help him on his quest. While he eventually catches his prey and revives Diane, he and Taboo become lovers, and both become fugitives.

Subsequent to this, Marc discovers he had fathered twin children—a girl named Jodi Morinaka and a boy known only as Aries—by an old girlfriend from Japan. He learns of Jodi when she tracks him down after her mother's death. Like her father, Jodi's alien genes give her superhuman powers, and she takes the identity of Crimson so she can adventure with him. Backlash and Taboo arrange a pardon for their crimes in return for working for the United States' Department of Paranormal Science Investigations (PSI). Taboo's initial approach by the government results in a multi-super-powers fight throughout the house as several of the FBI agents lose their cool and employ violence. "Backlash" #21. In the same issue, Marc is dealing with emotions over Ares, he has recently learned not only that he has a son, but Ares is a cold-blooded, brain-washed assassin.

Marc makes friends with the animal-faced adventurer Dingo, who helps him out on more than one case. It is around this point Marc finally learns of his Kherubim ancestry—for reasons best known to himself, Ferrian had never told Marc. Marc is placed in charge of forming a team of superpowered operatives codenamed Wildcore for Department PSI.

Around this time Marc battles several of Dingo's associates, a race of animal-people that call themselves The Kindred.

More Tragedy

In an issue of WILDC.A.T.s, the long-lived Savant attempts to recruit Marc for a new version of the team. He turns her down.

He works with Wildcore until most of this team are killed trying to stop a breakout at the Purgatory Max facility, as seen in the Gen-Active series. Marc survives thanks to the assistance of former DV8 member Evo who had been imprisoned for the murder of an NYPD officer. Marc loses a leg, has it replaced with an artificial one and returns to duty.

According to his daughter, Marc gives up the name "Backlash"; seeking, as she put it, to keep it in the family, Jodi uses it herself. Marc Slayton appears in Sleeper as a plainclothes agent of Department PSI with the rank of Commander.

Re-Emergence

In a back-up story that ran through four different Wildstorm titles, Marc was featured in a story called "Slayton: Gauntlet" in which he must escape from the mutated experiments held within International Operations Research and Containment Facility #42 in New Mexico.  Throughout the story, Slayton is required to use his powers in order to survive, revealing that he retains the ability to turn into mist, as well as use his psi-whips.  At the conclusion of the arc, Marc laments not having his costume and plans to seek out some of his former Team 7 cohorts, indicating a possible return to his more active role in the Wildstorm universe.

Team 7 Returns

In Wild C.A.T.S issue 14, Lynch approaches the Wild C.A.T.S. with Team 7 in order to team up with them and face the god-like Tao, who is consolidating his power in hopes of reigning over the post-Armageddon world.  While severely outmatched, the C.A.T.S. and Team 7 get assistance from Max Faraday, who downloaded God-like abilities from the internet and has saved scores of people in pocket universes that he's kept hidden from super heroes and villains alike.  However, Tao wants Max's power, and lures him into battle, leaving Slayton and other Team 7 members to battle Tao's cronies.  Slayton is seen leaping into battle and using his psi-whips to lift and incapacitate Blackwolf while Ladytron blasts him with a sonic beam from her mouth.

Alternate version
In one alternate universe, Marc Slayton works as team leader for Stormwatch, headed by Jack Hawksmoor.

The Wild Storm
In the 2017 reboot of the WildStorm line, The Wild Storm, Marc Slayton is one of the members of Project: Thunderbook, an Internal Operations project run by former director John Lynch. In Thunderbook, Slayton and others had their DNA spliced with that of alien(Kherubim/Khera) descent, giving him extraordinary powers as a part of his 'implant.'

However, after Lynch was forced out of I/O, Project: Thunderbook was shut down, and the subjects given cover identities. Over the years, Slayton's implant became sentient and aware of its descent, allying itself with the Khera on earth. As the implant began to communicate with Slayton, his mental state began to deteriorate, as he began to murder people to feed the implant, which he calls the "Carer," a misheard version of Khera.

When I/O began to look into Project: Thunderbook, John Lynch began to track down the previous subjects, starting with Slayton. However, when Lynch found out about his loss of sanity, Slayton attempted to murder him. After Lynch escaped, Slayton began to hunt him down, along with other Gen:Active subjects created by I/O rival Skywatch's Dr. Helspont after the deterioration of Thunderbook. Along the way, Slayton murdered one other Skywatch implanted agent, and attempted to attack Midnighter and Apollo, but fled as soon as it was clear he could not take them. Slayton eventually found Lynch after he warned all of the other members of Thunderbook, but was convinced by him to instead go to New York to take out I/O, as it would be beneficial to the 'Carer.'

Powers and abilities
Thanks to his Kherubim genes, Marc is virtually immortal and has accrued three thousand years of combat experience. He is an expert martial artist and trained in the use of most weapons. His agility is superhuman. Exposure to the Gen-Factor released several latent powers, including the ability to generate psychic energy whips out the backs of his hands. He can use these whips for various purposes; in combat he uses them to constrict his opponents, shocking them with the energy running through the whips or to cut through objects. He can use the energy whips as grappling hooks. The whips are very durable, but beings of great strength can break them, causing painful psionic feedback. 

Marc can also transform his body and clothes into mist - as well as being useful for infiltration and defense, this also allows him to swiftly heal most injuries, which tend to vanish after transforming to mist and back. While he could at first use this ability at will, when the Gen-Factor was flushed from his system, his ability to use this power was restricted to only once or twice a day. However, his energy whips had doubled in power as a result. When first exposed to the Gen-Factor, Marc had extensive psionic powers including telepathy and telekinesis, but these powers waned over the years and even completely disappeared together with the Gen-Factor removed from his system. 

It is possible that his telekinetic powers contributed to the strengthening of his psionic whips, which are in actuality just a visible mental projection that allow Marc to manipulate matter with his mind. For instance, if one did not see the whips, it would appear that Marc was picking up an object, or slicing an object in half with telekinetic abilities, so it can be argued that Marc's stronger psi-whips are due to his telekinetic powers becoming part and parcel of his psychic energy whips. 

Although he had not been seen using his abilities since the loss of his leg during the Wildcore tragedy, succeeding stories imply that Marc Slayton retains his powers in some form. He still has the ability to turn into mist, though he can only do it once a day, for a limited time, and can only 'take along' things very close to his skin, i.e. a costume, since his loose shirt, pants, and cybernetic leg remained behind when he used this ability to escape to safety while being attacked by a monstrous creature.  This is a serious denigration of this ability, as Backlash was once capable of turning several people into mist along with him.  

Marc also uses his psi-whips, which now appear to have reverted to their purple hue (they were originally pink, then purple, and finally yellow after the Gen-Factor was flushed from his system, when they took on a more erratic, "energetic" appearance along with the shift to being yellow.) After not using them 
for some time, during Slayton: Gauntlet, he used them in the final scene, explaining that he is "never unarmed."  The whips maintained their previous "high energy" appearance, unlike the more "flaming tendril" look that they had prior to the Gen-Factor leaving his body. In recent issues of Wild C.A.T.S. Slayton uses the whips in much the same way he did as far back as The Kindred, lifting and incapacitating a large enemy, in this case, Blackwolf.  The whips are not represented as coming from the backs of his hands as has been traditionally depicted, but rather, from anywhere in the erratic sphere of energy surrounding Slayton's fists.

References

1994 comics debuts 
DC Comics characters who are shapeshifters
DC Comics characters who have mental powers 
DC Comics characters who can move at superhuman speeds
DC Comics martial artists 
DC Comics telekinetics
Fictional characters with immortality
Fictional whip users
Wildstorm Universe superheroes
WildStorm titles
Stormwatch and the Authority characters
Point Blank and Sleeper characters
Characters created by Jim Lee
Characters created by Brett Booth